Massivit 3D Printing Technologies Ltd. (Massivit3D) is an Israeli public company traded on the Tel Aviv Stock Exchange (TASE:MSVT)  Its  headquarters are in Lod.  The company develops, constructs and sells Additive Manufacturing printers for production of large parts and develops printing materials for use in their printers.

History
Massivit 3D was founded in 2013 by Gershon Miller, Igor Yakubov and Moshe Uzan. 

In 1994, Miller established “Idanit” printing, acquired four years later by Scailex Corporation (formerly Scitex) for $60 million. 

In 1998 he was one of three  founders of “Objet”, which in 2012 merged  with its competitor Stratasys (Nasdaq: SSYS),  that had market value of  $5.7 billion. In February 2021, By IPO it had raised $50 million.
The CEO is Erez Zimerman and the chairman is Yaron Yechezkel. 
  
Investors includes:  institutional investor (including  Migdal and Mor Investment House),  
Stratasys,  Yaskawa Electric Corporation  
  
and Alpha hedge fund.

Products
Massivit 3D main markets are: transportation, shipping, entertainment, furniture, construction and aviation.  The first generation of the company’s printers inject Dimengel, an acrylic-based plastic gel, that polymerized  and creates solid layers under ultraviolet light.  
In 2016, the company launched its first printer, Massivit 1800.  

In 2021, the company launched Massivit 5000, an improved version of Massivit 1800. It provides a double material method on which two separate parts can be printed concurrently using disparate materials.   

The second generation of printers, based on Massivit 10000, was developed to manufacture molds for composite material end parts for the fibre-reinforced plastic industry.   
It enabling production of  jigs, molds, master tools, fixtures and mandrels. The process is designed to decrease manual labor and material costs, while reducing tooling time.  
The product 3D prints an outer, wash away shell with the print head and intermittently fills the shell with a thermoset, epoxy casting material, forming an isotropic mold. The encapsulated mold is immersed in water causing, the outer shell to crumble without redundant pollutants, leaving the mold. 
In May 2022, the company launched Massivit 10000,  that won two prizes: The American Composites Manufacturers Association award 
in the category 'manufacturing' and the IBEX innovation award in the category 'boatbuilding'.  The company sells printers in 40 countries.

References

External Links
Official site

Companies listed on the Tel Aviv Stock Exchange
Industry in Israel
3D printer companies
2021 initial public offerings
Computer hardware companies

he:מאסיבית